Abdaki (also Romanized as Ābdakī and Abdakī; also known as Kalāteh-ye Adakī) is a village in Borun Rural District, in the Eslamiyeh District of Ferdows County, South Khorasan Province, Iran. At the 2006 census, its population was 66, in 11 families.

References 

Populated places in Ferdows County